Karol Herman Stępień (1910–1943) was a Polish Roman Catholic martyr.

Early life
Stępień was born on October 21, 1910 in Lodz, Poland. He grew up in a poor family in Lodz.

Stępień was educated in Lodz. He attended the Franciscan seminary in Lviv, graduating in 1929. He then attended the Pontifical University of St. Bonaventure in Rome. He was ordained as a Franciscan priest in 1937 in Rome.

Stępień returned to Poland, where he earned a Master's degree in Theology from Lviv University.

Vocation
He served as a Francisco priest in Radomsko and Vilnius. In 1940, he was asked by Bishop Kazimierz Bukraba of the Roman Catholic Diocese of Pinsk to go to Piaršai to help their parish priest, Achille Puchala.

When the Nazis invaded in 1943, Stepien decided to stay and keep preaching.  He declared: "Pastors cannot leave the believers!".

Death
On July 19, 1943, the Nazis took Stępień, Puchala and their parishioners to a barn in Borowikowszczyzna, which they set on fire, thus murdering them all together.

Legacy
Stępień was beatified by Pope John Paul II on June 13, 1999 in Warsaw, Poland.

References

1910 births
1943 deaths
Clergy from Łódź
University of Lviv alumni
108 Blessed Polish Martyrs
Polish beatified people
20th-century venerated Christians
Polish Franciscans
Franciscan beatified people